Mariusz Marcyniak (born 5 March 1992) is a Polish volleyball player, a member of Polish club Cuprum Lubin.

Career

Clubs
In 2015 he went to PGE Skra Bełchatów. On February 7, 2016 he played with PGE Skra and won the 2016 Polish Cup after beating ZAKSA in the final. In April 2016 he was a member of the same team which won a bronze medal in the 2015–16 PlusLiga championship.

Sporting achievements

Clubs

National championships
 2015/2016  Polish Cup, with PGE Skra Bełchatów
 2015/2016  Polish Championship, with PGE Skra Bełchatów
 2016/2017  Polish Championship, with PGE Skra Bełchatów

References

External links
 PlusLiga player profile

1992 births
Living people
People from Chełm
Sportspeople from Lublin Voivodeship
Polish men's volleyball players
BBTS Bielsko-Biała players
AZS Częstochowa players
Skra Bełchatów players
Warta Zawiercie players